The 2017 Basketball Champions League Final Four was the inaugural Basketball Champions League tournament. It was the concluding phase of the 2016–17 Basketball Champions League season.

Venue
The Santiago Martín hosted the final tournament for the first time.

Road to the Final Four

Note: In the table, the score of the Final Four team is given first (H = home; A = away).

Bracket

Semifinals

Semifinal A

Semifinal B

Third place game

Final
Iberostar Tenerife was enjoying its most successful season in the Liga ACB in club history as the club was in the first place of the regular season. Banvit were having a season in which the team won its first trophy by winning the Turkish Cup.

Playing at its home court, Tenerife won the game 63–59 behind Final Four MVP Marius Grigonis, who scored 18 points on 6 out of 10 three point shooting. Davin White added 14 points and 5 assists, while also hitting the most important three pointer of the game in the final minute. The league's MVP, Jordan Theodore, recorded 17 points and 9 assists for Banvit.

By winning the Champions League trophy, Tenerife was awarded with the prize money of €500,000.

References

External links
Basketball Champions League (official website)
FIBA Europe (official website)
Eurobasket.com League Page
Basketball Champions League Official YouTube Account

Final Four
International sports competitions hosted by Spain
April 2017 sports events in Europe
Sport in Tenerife